EME (2,5-diethoxy-4-methoxyamphetamine) is a lesser-known psychedelic drug. It is a diethoxy-methoxy analog of TMA-2. EME was first synthesized by Alexander Shulgin. In his book PiHKAL, both the dosage and duration are unknown. EME produces few to no effects. Very little data exists about the pharmacological properties, metabolism, and toxicity of EME.

See also 
 Phenethylamine
 Psychedelics, dissociatives and deliriants

References

Substituted amphetamines
Phenol ethers